The 1977 British motorcycle Grand Prix was the thirteenth and final round of the 1977 Grand Prix motorcycle racing season. It took place on 13–14 August 1977 at Silverstone Circuit. 1977 marked the beginning of a new era, as it was the first time the event was held on the British mainland after the Isle of Man TT had represented the United Kingdom on the FIM Grand Prix calendar for the previous 28 years since the championship's inception in 1949. Once the most prestigious race of the year, the Isle of Man TT had been increasingly boycotted by the top riders, and finally succumbed to pressure for increased safety in racing events. It was also the final grand prix race for Giacomo Agostini.

500cc classification

350 cc classification

250 cc classification

125 cc classification

Sidecar classification

References

British motorcycle Grand Prix
British
Motorcycle Grand Prix
August 1977 sports events in the United Kingdom